Christmas in NYC Live In Concert is a concert residency by American singer Lea Michele, in support of her third studio album and first holiday album, Christmas in the City. The residency was performed at The Concert Hall at NY Society for Ethical Culture in New York City.

Background
On October 25, 2019, Michele announced on social media that she would perform 3 intimate shows in her hometown of New York City to go with the spirit of her new holiday album.

Setlist
"The Most Wonderful Time of the Year"
"Silver Bells"
"I'll Be Home For Christmas"
"Rockin' Around The Christmas Tree"
 "River"
 "Silent Night"
 "White Christmas"
"Don't Rain on My Parade" 
 "Poker Face"
 "The Edge of Glory"
 "Make You Feel My Love" 
 "Angels We Have Heard on High"
 "Do You Want to Build a Snowman?"
 "Last Christmas"
 "O Holy Night"
 "Christmas In New York"

Encore
 "Have Yourself A Merry Little Christmas"

Dates

References

2019 concert residencies
Christmas music
Lea Michele